means "outrageous" or "preposterous" +  "book" in Japanese.  Recently the word has gained another meaning thanks to the activity of Togakkai (the Academy of Tondemo books) which annually award Nihon Tondemo-bon Taisho (Japan Tondemo Book Award), which is similar to the Golden Raspberry Award or the Ig Nobel Prize.  Tondemo-bon is defined by the academy as "something amusing from a perspective that differs from what the author intends." The award covers not just conspiracy theory or pseudoscience but also includes historical revisionism as well as atheists or scientific sceptics who make rather biased attacks toward the former.  The members of Togakkai included religious figures as well as scientists and other academics.  In Japan, this genre has superseded similar activities of scientific sceptics.

Some winners of the Nihon Tondemo-bon Taisho (Japan Tondemo Book Award):
Ninja, Its Origin and Technique, an ostensibly scholarly exploration of the history of ninja techniques, including the secret magical hand gestures
Amazing Science Fiction Weapons, a notoriously poorly researched book detailing the weapons and plots of science fiction series
A Final Warning from Mother Earth, a guide to the future based on the knowledge of the ancients  of Atlantis and other civilizations

See also 
 Conspiracy theory
 UFO conspiracy theory
 Hollow Earth
 Pseudoscience

External links
Togakkai (the Academy of Outrageous Books) 

Japanese words and phrases
Pseudoscience